The Walt Grealis Special Achievement Award is awarded by the Canadian Academy of Recording Arts and Sciences to "individuals who have contributed to the growth and development of the Canadian music industry." It is given annually every Juno Awards ceremony and named after one of the founders of the awards.

Recipients
 1984 - J. Lyman Potts
 1985 - A. Hugh Joseph
 1986 - Jack Richardson
 1987 - Bruce Allen
 1989 - Sam Sniderman
 1990 - Raffi
 1991 - Mel Shaw
 1992 - William Harold Moon
 1993 - Brian Robertson
 1994 - John Mills
 1995 - Louis Applebaum
 1996 - Ronnie Hawkins
 1997 - Dan Gibson
 1998 - Sam Feldman
 1999 - Allan Waters
 2000 - Emile Berliner
 2001 - Daniel Caudeiron
 2002 - Michael Cohl
 2003 - Terry McBride
 2004 - Walt Grealis
 2005 - Allan Slaight
 2006 - Bernie Finkelstein
 2007 - Donald K. Tarlton
 2008 - Moses Znaimer
 2009 - Fred Sherratt
 2010 - Ross Reynolds
 2011 - Deane Cameron
 2012 - Gary Slaight
 2013 - Larry LeBlanc
 2014 - Frank Davies
 2015 - Ray Danniels
 2016 - Rosalie Trombley
 2017 - Randy Lennox
 2018 - Denise Donlon
 2019 - Duff Roman
 2021 - Pegi Cecconi
 2022 - Denise Jones
 2023 - Ron Sakamoto

See also

Music of Canada

References 

Canadian music awards